It Waits is a 2005 American horror film directed by Steven R. Monroe and starring Cerina Vincent, Dominic Zamprogna, and Greg Kean. Written by Richard Christian Matheson, Thomas E. Szollosi, and Stephen J. Cannell, the film is about a  forest ranger who encounters a terrible creature who has been killing people in the remote national forest where she works. When the creature attacks her isolated ranger station and kills her forest ranger boyfriend, she goes after the creature. Filmed on location in British Columbia, Canada, It Waits was a direct-to-DVD release in the United States and worldwide.

Plot
In a remote national forest, five archaeology students discover a cave associated with an ancient Native American legend. Using explosives to gain entrance, they find prehistoric drawings and bones strewn across the cave floor. Suddenly from the shadows, a creature emerges and slaughters the students.

Two months later, forest ranger Danielle "Danny" St. Claire (Cerina Vincent) is sitting on the floor of an isolated ranger station tower in the same national forest—drunk and crying. Remembering the tragic car crash that killed her best friend Julie Cassidy, Danny blames herself for the tragedy because she was driving after a night of heavy drinking. Her boss Rick Bailey (Greg Kean) calls to tell her she will be alone at the station for the next few days while her colleagues battle a forest fire. He also informs her that cracks have developed in nearby Devil's Gate Dam and instructs her to drain off water to relieve the pressure. That night, awakened by nightmares of the accident, Danny hears sounds coming from outside. With rifle in hand, she descends the tower to investigate and discovers claw marks on the tool shed door.

The next morning, Danny's forest ranger boyfriend Justin Rawley (Dominic Zamprogna) arrives to keep her company. After inspecting the dam, they return to the station for a romantic dinner during which Danny confesses she was the one driving the car when it crashed, and that she allowed the police to think Julie was driving. Justin consoles her and they make love. During the night, they're awakened by the sound of the emergency siren on the roof. They investigate and discover that something destroyed the satellite dish, rolled Justin's jeep over into a ditch, and disabled the radio. The next day, they go to the nearby dam to use its radio. They meet up with Carl and Evelyn Nash—two campers that recently went missing. Despite Justin's warnings, the Nashes head out on their own. Soon they are hunted down by the creature and killed. Meanwhile, at the dam, Justin and Danny find the radio room completely trashed. Later when they enter the station, Evelyn's bloody corpse swings down from the ceiling on a chain. When they rush outside, Carl's body is thrown off the roof onto them.

Justin heads off alone to get help. That night in the woods, the creature viciously attacks and kills him. The next morning, Danny notices the tool shed was broken into. Inside she finds Justin's severed head on a shelf and his bloody body on the roof. Danny buries Justin's remains and decides to fight back. That night the creature attacks the station, but Danny is able to shoot and wound it. The next morning, Danny discovers a trail of green gooey blood and follows it to the cave. There, she meets the teacher of the students who were killed in the cave. He reveals what he knows about the creature, including some of its weaknesses. He also explains that the demon is drawn to Danny's negative energy—her guilt over her friend's death—and provides her with documents about the ancient legend. Back at the station, Danny finds the dug-up corpses of the Nashes and Justin arranged around the table, with Justin's severed head on a plate. When it starts to rain, Danny remembers the teacher saying the creature doesn't like water. She goes off to hunt for the creature. When the rain stops, however, the creature attacks her, rips flesh from her leg, and then flies away. Back at the station, Danny finds the Nashes' cellphone and calls her boss Rick and tells him to bring the SWAT team, but he dismisses her request believing she's drunk.

The next day, Rick arrives at the station alone and accompanies Danny to the cave, which she plans to destroy with several sticks of dynamite. Soon they discover the teacher's body impaled on a pole in the middle of the road. The creature flies by and drops Justin's headless body onto Rick, crushing him to death. Danny drives off with the creature in close pursuit. As she approaches the cave, the creature lands on the hood and attacks Danny, who steers the vehicle directly into the opening of the cave, sending the creature flying inside. When it attacks one last time, Danny lights the dynamite and escapes just as the dynamite explodes, sealing the entrance with the creature trapped inside. Afterwards, Danny returns to the station, lays her ranger badge on the table, and then leaves. Sometime later, Danny tells a policeman about the killings but says she doesn't know who did it. Then she explains that she was the driver in the accident that killed Julie, accepting responsibility for her friend's death.

Cast
 Cerina Vincent as Danielle "Danny" St. Claire
 Dominic Zamprogna as Justin Rawley
 Greg Kean as Rick Bailey
 Eric Schweig as Joseph Riverwind
 Matt Jordon as Wakinyah Creature
 Miranda Frigon as Julie Cassidy
 Sean Wei Mah as Ben Wheelock
 Tinsel Korey as Lark Rainwater
 Fred Henderson as Carl Nash
 Chilton Crane as Evelyn Nash
 Sean Campbell as Lt. Morris Black
 Michael Bell as Voice of Hoppy

Production

Development
It Waits was directed by Steven R. Monroe. The original screenplay was written by Richard Christian Matheson and Thomas E. Szollosi, and was initially purchased by a French producer who intended to shoot the film in the United Kingdom. After this initial deal fell through due to lack of financing, Stephen J. Cannell purchased the project for his production company and signed a deal with IDT Entertainment/Anchor Bay. Cannell rewrote the original script, changing the lead male character "Mike" to a female forest ranger. Cannell also added the love story between Danny and Justin.

Casting
Cerina Vincent was director Steven R. Monroe's first choice to play the lead character Danny. Monroe was convinced that Vincent could bring to the role an appeal to both men and women, and that she could deliver the dramatic scenes in the film. Cannell also felt that Vincent had the talent to carry the film. After appearing in Cabin Fever in 2002, Vincent was not eager to do another horror film. After reading the script, however, she was immediately attracted to the character and the acting challenges it presented.

Filming
Four separate caves were used, including an old copper mine. The  ranger station tower was constructed in two pieces. A few shots show the tower assembled. Most of the interior shots of the top half of the tower were filmed while that piece was on the ground.

Release

Home media
It Waits was released on DVD by Anchor Bay on May 23, 2006. Anchor Bay/Starz later re-released the film on Blu-ray on May 25, 2010.

Critical response
It Waits received generally negative reviews. 
In ReelFilm Reviews, David Nusair gave the film two out of four stars, commending Vincent's performance, and action sequences. However, Nusair criticized the film's melodramatic aspects and slow pacing. Nusair concludes, "While it's certainly better than the majority of its straight-to-video horror brethren, It Waits is ultimately bogged down by a melodramatic opening half-hour and an overall feeling of tediousness." Robert Pardi from TV Guide gave the film one out of four stars, calling it "a standard-issue rustic splatter film". Pardi notes that the screenwriters "waste a lot of time developing Danny's back story" and director Steven R. Monroe "piles on the gore"—the result is "repetitive, silly and more than a little gross". HorrorNews.net gave the film a negative review, stating that the film felt drawn out, criticizing the film's pacing, performances, and the monster's lack of screen time. Bill Gibron from DVD Talk gave the film two and a half out of five stars, calling it "pretentious", and panned the film's "barely coherent" acting, direction, and narrative inconsistencies.

Steve Barton from Dread Central rated the film a score of three out of five, commending the film's direction, writing, performances, while also stating that occasional scenes came off as "whiney and unnecessary".

References

External links
 
 
 

2005 direct-to-video films
2005 horror films
American monster movies
2000s monster movies
2005 films
Films directed by Steven R. Monroe
Supernatural slasher films
Native Americans in popular culture
Films with screenplays by Richard Christian Matheson
Films set in forests
Films shot in British Columbia
2000s English-language films
2000s American films